Black Crypt is a role-playing video game. It was Raven Software's debut title, and was published for the Amiga by Electronic Arts in 1992. Its 3D realtime style is similar to FTL Games' popular Dungeon Master, where the player leads a party of four heroes through a large dungeon to ultimately confront and defeat a powerful enemy. A version for the Sega Mega Drive was in development but never released.

Gameplay 

The player is given the task of creating four heroes to traverse the twenty-eight levels of the "Tomb of the Four Heroes" to defeat the evil Estoroth Paingiver. Estoroth, a powerful cleric, had been banished to a black crypt for committing unspeakable acts. The guilds of the country of Astera believe Estoroth is attempting to unseal his crypt, and send the four heroes to seal him away for good.

Unlike Dungeon Master, Black Crypt does not have pre-generated characters to select as possible heroes. When starting a new game the player must first create and name their four heroes, who are of set class (fighter, cleric, magic user and druid), as well as set their starting attributes.

While most games of this type did not include maps of the dungeon (meaning players often mapped them out themselves on paper) the magic user has access to a spell called "Wizard Sight" which automatically maps the heroes movement and can be viewed in-game while the spell is active. Black Crypt also features 'bosses' on several levels, the first of which is actually within twenty spaces of the start location.

Development 
Black Crypt was originally conceived by Brian Raffel and Steve Raffel in the late 1980s as a non-electrical game set for pen-and-paper role-playing games, although work began in April 1990 to eventually turn their idea into a video game. The game's budget was $40,000.

According to a pre-release blurb in The One, Black Crypt consists of 12 interconnected dungeons rendered in 64-colour extra half-brite graphics, and an EA spokesman purported that Electronic Arts "like to think of the game as a dungeon simulator rather than a game."

Black Crypt and came on three 880k disks (excluding a game-save disk, used if not installed on a hard drive). The graphics mode used was called Extra Half-Bright, which allowed for a user defined palette of thirty-two colours, as well as an additional thirty-two colours which were half the brightness of the chosen palette, allowing for the game's gloomy atmosphere.

Reception 

Black Crypt received an 83% from German reviewer Amiga Joker.

Amiga Power gave the Amiga version of Black Crypt an overall score of 85%, the reviewer begins their review remarking their disdain for RPGs, calling them "escapism for accountants" but expressing that "[Black Crypt] somehow managed to draw me in and keep me there". Amiga Power criticized the game's plot as "boring", and calls Black Crypt "aesthetically unremarkable" and the title sequence "dull" and accompanying music "unsuitable rubbish", and sound effects 'unatmospheric' .Amiga Power furthermore calls it 'unoriginal' and expresses that Black Crypt appears based on Dungeon Master, and states that "The variety of monsters is not wide and none of them seem out of the ordinary." Despite these criticisms, Amiga Power's reviewer expresses that they "quickly found myself excusing its flaws, and despite a lack of atmosphere there was a healthy feeling that progress was being made. Not once did I reach the stage where I thought 'Now what?' and that impresses me. ... beneath it all, it's actually a rather absorbing and playable game."

The One gave the Amiga version of Black Crypt an overall score of 92%, initially comparing it to Dungeon Master, but expressing that Black Crypt is a 'unique' RPG that sets itself apart from others, calling it "The state of the art in 3D role-playing games". The One praises Black Crypt's graphics and gameplay, stating that "Black Crypt is easily the best 3D role-playing game available on the Amiga. Aside from cosmetic improvements like smoother animation and superior artwork, it boasts features that are clearly the product of some thought being applied in the planning stages. ... What finally tips the balance in Black Crypt's favour is the delicate line between mental effort and combat and the superb way the plot leads you through the game." The One further praises the sound and controls, expressing that "sound effects in Black Crypt provide the player with often vital clues as to what's going on" and calling the controls 'admirable' and that they're "so intuitive that five minutes into the game you won't even notice [you're using it]".

References

External links 
Black Crypt at Hall of Light
Black Crypt at Lemon Amiga
Black Crypt at RavenGames.com

1992 video games
Action role-playing video games
Amiga games
Amiga-only games
Cancelled Sega Genesis games
First-person party-based dungeon crawler video games
Electronic Arts games
Fantasy video games
Role-playing video games
Video games developed in the United States